Madhav Chavan (born 1954) is a social activist and entrepreneur. He is the co-founder  and CEO of the educational non-profit, Pratham. He also started the Read India campaign, which aims to teach basic reading, writing and arithmetic to underprivileged children across India. Pratham has been recognized by the Kravis Prize and the Skoll Award for its innovativeness and leadership as a social entrepreneurial organization in the area of education. Chavan was the 2012 recipient of the WISE Prize for Education, which is widely considered the equivalent of the Nobel Prize in the field of education and recipient of Leading-Social-Contributor-Award which is the highest degree award in India for exemplary work in the area of operation. He was also the 2011 recipient of the Skoll Award for Social Entrepreneurship.

Early life
Madhav Chavan was born in Maharashtra to Yashwant Chavan, the founder of the Lenin-inspired Lal Nishan Party. He went to B.P.M High School in Khar and Jai Hind College. He received his B Sc and M Sc degrees in Chemistry from the Institute of Science in Mumbai. He received his Ph.D. in Chemistry at the Ohio State University in 1983.

Career
Madhav Chavan taught Chemistry at the University of Houston and the Institute of Chemical Technology, Mumbai before getting involved with adult literacy in the National Literacy Mission in the slums of Mumbai in 1989.

He returned to India in 1983. After producing literacy programmes for Doordarshan for a few years, he was invited to work with a Unicef project to teach in Mumbai’s slums.

He was a member of National Advisory Council from 2004 to 2008. He is also a member of the Governing Council of the Sarva Shiksha Abhiyan Mission (SSA) of the Government of India and has been a member of four half-yearly Joint Review Missions of SSA.

References

Empowering India through education

External links

 www.prathaminstitute.org
 Interview

Social workers from Maharashtra
Social workers
Living people
1954 births
Members of National Advisory Council, India
Academic staff of Delhi University
Ohio State University alumni
Asia Game Changer Award winners
Jai Hind College alumni